The Barak Valley is located in the southern region of the Indian state of Assam. The region is named after the Barak river. The Barak valley consists of three administrative districts of Assam - namely Cachar, Karimganj, and Hailakandi. The main, largest and capital city of the Valley is Silchar. Once North Cachar Hills was a part of the valley but In 1951 erstwhile Sub-Division was made a separate district and eventually curved out of Cachar. On 1 July 1983, Karimganj district was curved out from the eponymous subdivision of Cachar Valley. This was again repeated in 1989 with the creation of Hailakandi district.

Etymology 

The name "Barak" has derived from the Dimasa words 'Bra' & 'Kro'. Bra means bifurcation and Kro upper means portion/stream. The river Barak is bifurcated near Haritikar in the Karimganj district in to Surma River and Kushiyara River respectively. The upstream of this bifurcated river was called Brakro by the local Dimasa people.

Barak valley excluding Karimganj as a whole was once called or known as Cachar Valley and the origin of the name have two possibilities: The first theory suggests that it was named as such because of the Dimasa Kacharis kings who ruled the region as the original natives of Cachar Valley are known as Dimasa Cachari people and the second theory suggests that the word "Kachar" in Bengali language means a stretch of land at the foot of a mountain. Hence, it suggests that Cachar name might have been given by Bengalis of Sylhet as the land is surrounded by mountains from all the sides.

History

After the fall of the Kamarupa kingdom in the 12th century the region became a part of the Tripura Kingdom. In 1562 the Koch general Chilarai annexed the Cachar region to the Koch kingdom which came to be administered from Khaspur (or Kochpur) by his half-brother Kamalnarayan. After the death of the ruler Nara Narayan, the region became independent and was ruled by the descendants of Kamalnarayan, and they were known as the Dehans (after Dewan). In the 17th-century, the last Koch ruler's daughter married the king of the Kachari kingdom, and the rule of Khaspur passed into the hands of the Kachari rulers, who eventually moved their capital from Maibang (North Cachar Hills) to Khaspur (Cachar plains). Under Hairamba kingdom the Dimasa Kachari kingdom have flourished again who have established their capital at Khaspur, Plains of Cachar and in 1832 AD the Kachari kingdom lost its sovereignty and eventually came to an end because Britishers have captured the region as an invading force.

The Kalapur copper plates were issued by Sam Marundanatha, in the late 7th century A.D. It was learnt from them the Karimganj along with foothills of North Cachar hills was once passed on to the Samatata kingdom of the eastern Bengal. In late 10th century A.D, king Srichandra of the renowned Chandra dynasty of eastern Bengal incorporated the entire region within his Vanga Kingdom under Harikela dynasty. The Paschimbagh copper plate inscription was issued in 10th century A.D. by King Srichandra Dev of the Chandra dynasty that ruled the Harikela Kingdom from (reigned c. 930–975) AD. During this period, the Chandrapura matha or monastery, at Panchakhanda (now in Bangladesh's Sylhet), became a reputed centre of art, crafts and learning. From two Bhatera inscriptions of Ishana deva and Govindakeshava deva, it is learnt that there was an independent Srihatta kingdom in the 12th century within which the entire Karimganj district along with a major portion of the Cachar plains was incorporated into it. Historically the Srihatta Rajya, was ruled by the Buddhist and Hindu kingdoms of Harikela and Kamarupa respectively before passing to the control of the Sena and Deva dynasties in the early medieval period. Bengalis have been living in the Cachar plains since from the past 200 years. Up to 1837 A.D. the plains of Cachar Valley, was a sparsely populated region and are dominated by the Dimasa Cachari (Mongolians) under the rule of the Kachari Raja, who have established his Kingdom's capital at Khaspur, Cachar plains. He had a good number of Bengali advisers (mostly Brahmins) around him and gave grants of land to some of them, but the population was very much similar to that of the North Cachar Hills of today as evident from various historical chronicles. Bengali settlers from neighbouring East Bengal poured into the Cachar plains after the British Annexation of the region in 1832 A.D., and afterwards the plains portion of Cachar Valley, i.e., the Cachar and Hailakandi, have became a Bengali-majority colony. Once, Barak Valley from (1832-1874) A.D. was a part of Bengal Presidency under British Empire. The British Annexation of Cachar have transformed the demographic patterns of the valley overnight. There was a sudden phenomenal growth in population, While the plains of Cachar had about 50 thousands inhabitants in all in 1837 A.D. that is five years after it's annexation, which eventually indicates that there is a large scale immigration of people from outside. The population have swelled up to more than five lakhs a few years later. The population of Muslims in the colonial era Barak Valley decreased in the late 19th century largely because the fertile lands were occupied by earlier settlers of the region and later they have immigrated to the Present Hojai of Assam which was also a part of Kachari Kingdom up to 1832 AD. A population 85,522 of diverse backgrounds including hill tribes, in 1851 Census, Muslims and Hindus, 30,708 and 30,573 receptively mostly Bengalis, constituted 70% of the total population of Cachar Valley, followed by 10,723 Manipuris, 6,320 Kukis, 5,645 Naga and 2,213 Cacharis. While, Karimganj which have became a part of Cachar Valley plains after 1947, was a part of Sylhet before Partition of Bengal (1947). The region of Karimganj was under the rule of Pratapgarh Kingdom from (1489-1700s), which was eventually an Islamic Bengali kingdom.

Inclusion of Karimganj

In 1947, when a plebiscite was held in Sylhet of then Assam Province with majority voting for incorporation with Pakistan. The Sylhet district was divided into two; the easternmost subdivision of Sylhet which is known as Karimganj joined with India, and now is a district of Assam, whereas the rest of Sylhet joined East Bengal. Geographically the region is surrounded by hills from all three sides except its western plain boundary with Bangladesh. Nihar Ranjan Roy, author of Bangalir Itihash, claims that "South Assam / Northeastern Bengal or Barak Valley is the extension of the Greater Surma/Meghna Valley of Bengal in every aspect from culture to geography".

Assam's Surma Valley (now partly in Bangladesh) had Muslim-majority population. On the eve of partition, hectic activities intensified by the Muslim League as well Congress with the former having an edge. A referendum had been proposed for Sylhet District. Abdul Matlib Mazumdar along with Basanta Kumar Das (then Home Minister of Assam) travelled throughout the valley organising the Congress and addressing meetings educating the masses about the outcome of partition on the basis of religion. On 20 February 1947 Moulvi Mazumdar inaugurated a convention – Assam Nationalist Muslim's Convention at Silchar. Thereafter another big meeting was held at Silchar on 8 June 1947. Both the meetings, which were attended by a large section of Muslims paid dividend. He was also among the few who were instrumental in retaining the Barak Valley region of Assam, especially Karimganj with India. Mazumdar was the leader of the delegation that pleaded before the Radcliffe Commission that ensured that a part of Sylhet (now in Bangladesh) join with India despite being Muslim-majority (present Karimganj district). In return of that, Moulvibazar the only Hindu-majority district of Sylhet Division was given to East Pakistan during partition.

Demographics
According to the 2011 Indian census, Barak valley had a population of 3,624,599. Male population is 1,850,038 and female population is 1,774,561 respectively. Literacy rate is 76.27%. The population of Barak Valley is estimated to be over 4,386,089 people for upcoming 2021 census.

Languages

As per (2011) language census report, Bengali is the official as well as the most spoken language of the region with approximately 2,930,378 native speakers. Hindi, Manipuri, Bishnupriya and Dimasa are the next most widely spoken languages with 362,459, 126,498, 50,019 and 21,747 native speakers, respectively. Tripuri, Odia, Nepali and Marwari are also spoken by a considerable minority, while 2.43% of the total population speaks other tribal languages.

According to census 2011, the major languages of Cachar district are Bengali, Hindi, Manipuri, Bhojpuri, Bishnupriya Manipuri, Dimasa, Khasi, Hmar and Odia in descending order of population. In the Hailakandi district, the major languages are Bengali, Hindi, Tripuri language, Manipuri and Bhojpuri. In the Karimganj district, the major languages are Bengali and Hindi.

Religion

Hinduism, by a sliver, is the slight majority religion in the Barak Valley. The religious composition of the valley population is as follows: Hindus 50%, Muslims 48.1%, Christians 1.6%, and others 0.3%. Hindus are the majority in Cachar district (59.83%) with having (86.31%) Hindu in the district headquarter ; Silchar (which is also the main city of the valley). While Muslims are the majority in Hailakandi district (60.31%) and Karimganj district (56.36%), but Hailakandi town have (67.26%) Hindu majority, Karimganj town have also a Hindu Majority of (86.57%) as of 2011 census.

In Barak valley, the two districts of Karimganj and Cachar adjoining Bangladesh have noted a 30 per cent rise in Muslim population during the period between (2011–21). In 2011, the Muslim population in those bordering districts of the bordering areas was 395,659 and this has jumped up to 513,126 in 2021. Assam Police officials while conducting demographic survey have said that infiltration of Bangladeshis into Assam have created a huge demographic change in last 10 years.

Population
The below are population by district tehsils in 2011:

 Cachar district total – 1,736,617
 Sonai circle – 324,315
 Katigora circle – 291,875
 Udharbond circle – 124,090
 Lakhipur circle – 291,872
 Silchar circle – 704,465
 Hailakandi district total – 659,296
 Algapur circle – 121,379
 Hailakandi circle – 166,897
 Katlichara circle – 168,077
 Lala circle – 202,943
 Karimganj district total – 1,228,686
 Badarpur circle – 164,703
 Karimganj circle – 278,300
 Nilambazar circle – 242,451
 Patharkandi circle – 261,368
 Ramkrishna Nagar circle – 281,864

Trends

Hindu and Muslim population by district tehsils

Hindus are majority in three tehsils of Cachar district namely Silchar, Lakhipur and Udharbond, while Muslims are majority in Katigora and Sonai circle according to 2011 census.

Hindus are significant in two tehsils of Hailakandi namely Katlichara and Lala, while Muslims are majority in all the three tehsils, but in Katlichara Muslims form a plurality according to 2011 census.

Hindus are majority in two tehsils of Karimganj namely Patharkandi and Ramkrishna Nagar, while Muslims are majority in Nilambazar, Badarpur and Karimganj circle according to 2011 census.

Demography of district headquarters

Statehood demand

Most Bengali organisations of Barak Region have demanded a separate state for the people of Barak within the Bengali majority areas of Assam, particularly Bengali majority Barak valley, comprising the three districts Cachar, Hailakandi, Karimganj, as well as historical Dima Hasao of Undivided Cachar Valley and Hojai district to meet the criteria for creating a separate state for themselves by carving out from Assam's Assamese majority Brahmaputra valley post NRC. Silchar is the proposed capital of Barak state. Barak valley is the most neglected part of Assam in terms of its infrastructure development, tourism sector, educational institutions, hospitals, IT industries, G.D.P, H.D.I etc. which is still lagging behind in comparison to the Assam's mainland Brahmaputra valley which have access to all of those facilities mentioned above. On 20 January 2023, Barak Democratic Front topmost Bengali leader Mr. Pradip Dutta Roy have said, "If Centre is planning to grant separate statehood to Kamtapur, then they should also fulfilled the longstanding demand of Separate Barak state by granting the region separate statehood". In fact, the Southern most region of Assam that is Barak Valley have an overwhelming Bengali majority population of about (80.8%) as per 2011 census report.

The indigenous Dimasa Cachari people of Northeast India have been demanding a separate state called Dimaraji or "Dimaland" for several decades. It would comprise the Dimasa-inhabited areas, namely North Cachar Hills, greater parts of Cachar district, Hailakandi district, significant parts of Hojai district and Karbi Anglong district in Assam together with part of Dimapur district in Nagaland.

Festivals 

Durga puja is one of the major festivals of Barak valley, as the region is home to a large population of Bengalis in Assam. Durga puja is celebrated with great fervour and enthusiasm in every part of the region be it rural or urban areas with great joy and happiness. Annually, on average 2,500 puja pandals have been organized by puja committees throughout the valley, with 300 durga puja pandals are being concentrated in Silchar alone. The festival marks the victory of good over evil.

Busu Dima is an annual cultural festival celebrated by the Dimasa Kachari tribe of North Cachar Hills and Cachar of Barak valley. It is the biggest harvesting agricultural festival. It is celebrated after the completion of grain harvest in different villages of the valley and hills. The festival is usually organized in the month of January.

Baidima is a tradition festival of Indigenous Dimasa Cachari tribe of North Cachar Hills and Cachar. It is being celebrated in the month of January just after Busu Dima festival. The traditional dance continued for a week. On that day, along with dance they also sing songs. In haflong, locals organized cultural events, public meetings, rally and various programs related to this festival.

Charak puja (Pohela Boishakh) the Bengali new year, is one of the most important and major festivals of the valley celebrated by the ethnic Bengalis irrespective of their religious affiliation and social status. This festival marks the beginning of Bengali new year and is being celebrated 15 April every year.

Eid
Eid is also a major festival of the region as the Muslims constitute half of valley's population. Just like Durga puja, every year lakhs of Muslims celebrated eid with great joy and happiness throughout the valley specially in Muslim-majority Karimganj and Hailakandi district.

Social issues
Bengali Language Movement in Barak Valley

 
Over 80 percent of Assam's Barak Valley are Bengali people and speak Bengali language. On 24 October, a bill was passed by Assam's late Chief Minister Mr. Bimala Prasad Chaliha in the Assam Legislative Assembly making Assamese as the only sole official language of the state. On 5 February 1961, the Cachar Gana Sangram Parishad was formed to protest against the imposition of Assamese in the Bengali-speaking Barak Valley. Rathindranath Sen was chief person of the organisation. People soon started protesting in Silchar, Karimganj and Hailakandi. On 24 April, the Parishad flagged off a fortnight-long Padayatra in the Barak Valley to raise awareness among the masses, which ended after 200 miles reaching to Silchar on 2 May. 
On 18 May, the Assam police arrested three prominent leaders of the movement, namely Nalinikanta Das, Rathindranath Sen and Bidhubhushan Chowdhury, the editor of weekly Yugashakti. On 19 May, the dawn to dusk hartal started. Picketing started in the sub-divisional towns of Silchar, Karimganj and Hailakandi. A Bedford truck carrying nine arrested activists from Katigorah was fired and the truck driver and the policemen escorting the arrested fled the spot. Soon after that the paramilitary forces, guarding the railway station, started beating the protesters with rifle butts and batons without any provocation from them. They fired 17 rounds into the crowd. Twelve persons received bullet wounds and were carried to hospitals. Nine of them died that day. Two more persons died later. One person, Krishna Kanta Biswas survived for another 24 hours with a bullet wound in chest. Ullaskar Dutta send nine bouquets for nine martyrs. On 20 May, the people of Silchar took out a procession with the bodies of the martyrs in protest of the killings. After the incident and more protests, the Assam government had to withdraw the circular and Bengali was ultimately given official status in the Barak region by Assam government. Soon after that a circular of Section 5 of Assam Language Act XVIII, 1961, was enacted to safeguards the use of Bengali language in the Cachar district. It says, "Without prejudice to the provisions contained in Section 3, the Bengali language shall be used for administrative and other official purposes up to and including district level."

Language controversy

On 18 October 2021, a state government hoarding which was written in Assamese language has been found smeared with black ink in Barak valley's administrative capital Silchar's Petrol Pump area. It was found that two Bengali organizations namely: Barak Democratic Yuba Front and All Bengali Students Youth Organisation have been involved in that activity and have accused that the government of Assam has been trying to impose their Assamese language on us (referring to Bengali-majority Barak Valley) through Assamese hoarding as a starting and have said that "We strictly stands against it (i.e imposition)". The smearing of the government hoarding has led to condemnation from people and various regional organisations of the Brahmaputra Valley, where Assamese organizations such as All Assam Students Union and Asom Jatiyatabadi Yuba Chatra Parishad have severely reacted, deeply saddened and protested against it. In retaliation, several Bengali hoardings in Assamese-dominated Brahmaputra Valley have also meet the same fate. The political 'language wars' and strife between the ethnic Assamese and Bengalis have led to several 'martyrs' on both sides of the administrative divisions. On 19 May 1961, 11 Bengali Protestors at Silchar railway station were killed for protesting against forceful imposition of Assamese language in Barak Valley region. Similarly, during Assam Movement of (1979-1985) or popularly known as the Assam Agitation which aims at detaining and deporting Illegal Bangladeshi immigrants from the state saw as many as 855 Assamese people gave up their lives to protect the Linguistic, ethnic and cultural identity of Assam.

 Immigration of Bengali refugees in Cachar Valley 

In 1947 during Partition of Bengal period, it has been found that from 15 August 1947 to April 1950, the Bengali Hindu refugees population in Cachar increased to 200,000 and but after Liaquat–Nehru Pact it came down to 93,177 in 1951. According to 1961 census, the number of East Bengali refugees living in Cachar alone is found to be 156,307 which is way higher than the previous census. No new Hindu immigration happened in the post 1971 period in Barak valley. Bengali Hindus who landed up in Barak valley from Bangladesh in the post 1971 census  have moved out of the region before the 1991 census. The number of Hindu immigrants from Bangladesh in Barak Valley has varied estimates. According to the Assam government, 1.3–1.5 lakh such people residing in the Barak Valley are eligible for citizenship if the Citizenship Amendment Act of 2019 becomes a law.

In March 2020, Wasbir Hussain, the editor in chief of North East Live and member of clause 6 committee while defining who is an Assamese have stated that the original inhabitants of Barak valley are a part of greater Assamese society and he further said that illegal immigrants and migrants are of different bracket. Regarding Indigenousity, Those Bengali-speaking Muslims of Barak Valley (comprising districts of Cachar, Hailakandi and Karimganj) who bears surnames like Choudhury, Mazumdar/Mazumder, Laskar/Lashkar, Barlaskar, Barobhuiya, Mazarbhuiya, Talukdar and Hazari and other regular titles mostly brought and given by Kachari kings are Native. The Barak Valley region is often described as a division filled with Bangladeshis. It lost its "Bangladeshi tag" after the final NRC draft results were published on 31 July 2018. Mr. Paul, a resident of Cachar district, said that the latest NRC draft had put an end to the controversy regarding the citizenship of the residents of the Valley. He further said: “It was often claimed that they are all or the majority of people of the valley are from Bangladesh. NRC draft results have shown that nearly 90% of Barak residents are Indian citizens. The Barak Valley had a population of about 37 lakh, as per last 2011 Census. NRC draft have dropped four lakh of the 37 lakh residents, majority of whom are Bengali people. As per NRC results, about 8% of the residents of Cachar, 11.82% of Karimganj and 14.2% of Hailakandi didn’t feature their names on the latest final draft list. As a whole, about 11% residents of Barak could not make their name appears on the list.https://timesofindia.indiatimes.com/india/barak-valley-in-assam-sees-large-inclusion-of-applicants-in-the-final-draft-nrc/articleshow/65216777.cms

Barak-Mizoram dispute

Mizoram used to be a district of Assam as Lushai hills before being carved out as a separate union territory and later, becoming another separate state in 1987 by States Reorganisation Act, 1956. Because of the history, the district's borders did not really matter for local Mizos for a long time. Mizoram shares a border with the districts Cachar, Hailakandi and Karimganj which comes under Barak valley region of Assam.
Over time, the two states started having different perceptions about where the demarcation should be. While Mizoram wants it to be along an Inner Line Permit notified in 1875 to protect indigenous tribals from outside influence, which Mizos feel is part of their historical homeland, Barak valley region of Assam wants it to be demarcated according to district boundaries drawn up much later. Conflicting territorial claims have persisted for long between Assam's Barak and Mizoram, which share a 164.6 km inter-state border. There were several clashes between the local people of the Mizoram and Barak regarding land disputes in the border areas on regular basis. The root of the dispute is a 1,318 km2 ( 509 square miles) area of hills and forests that Mizoram claims as its own. This is on the basis of an 1875 British law. But Assam insists this area is part of their as its "constitutional boundary". On 17 November 2022, Mizoram Home Minister have apologized for the clashes that have occurred in Barak-Mizoram border in which six police personnel and one civilian were killed in Lailapur.

 Communalism 
Barak valley has witnessed many major communinal riots in 1968, 1990, 2017 and 2019 in Karimganj, Hailakandi, Silchar and again in Hailakandi.

Lists of riots involving Communalism in Barak valley region:Karimganj 1968 riotIn the 1968 Karimganj riots, a cow belonging to a Muslim wandered into a Hindu house. When a Hindu boy tried to chase the cow, a few Muslims beat him up. Soon after that clashes erupted between the two communities. The ensuing riot claimed 82 lives.Hailakandi 1990 riotIn October 1990, a wounded cow was found near a common land, which led to clashes between Hindus and Muslims. Police records reveal that the Hindus of Hailakandi had demanded that parcel of land to construct a Kali temple. In fact, Sangh Parivar had earlier organised pujas to ritually purify bricks for shilayas at Ayodhya on the common land. The appearance of an injured cow hurt their sentiments and led to a riot resulting in many casualties.Silchar 2013 riotIn 2013, rumours of beef being found in a temple in Silchar sparked Hindu Muslim clashes in which at least 30 people were injured.Silchar 2015 riotIn 2015, there was tension yet again when the head of a slaughtered cow was found in a temple in Silchar. On the same year, allegations of "love jihad" – a term used by Hindutva groups to allege a conspiracy by Muslim men to marry women from other religions solely to convert them to Islam – sparked violent clashes in the city area.Silchar 2017 riotOn 7 June 2017, Clashes broke out between two communities in the Silchar city of Assam's Cachar district on Tuesday evening. The incident took place in the Janigunj area of Silchar. According to police 11 civilians and eight police officials were injured in large scale stone pelting. However, there were no casualties in the incident.Hailakandi 2019 riotLocal reports said that the tension started when motorbikes owned by Muslim devotees were vandalised while they were praying inside a mosque. The motorbike owners lodged a first information report and demanded that the police take action against the accused and said that they will offer prayers on the road if action was not taken. Mohneesh Mishra, Hailakandi's police chief, told Scroll.in that the clashes began when a group of Muslim men assembled on a public road in the town and said they will offer prayers on the street. "The Hindu community tried to stop them and that led to an argument and soon after that it turned into riot," said Mishra, while adding that heavy security had been deployed in the area. At least 14 people were injured out of which 3 were police Constables and also 1 was killed in a communal clash in Hailakandi district in Assam which have occurred on 10 July 2019.Hailakandi 2021 riot'

Tension began at Hailakandi's Serispore Tea Garden area after an e-rickshaw driver who happened to be a Muslim and his passengers (who were all Hindus) entered into an argument. After this confrontation, people from two separate groups gathered at the site and started attacking each other. Soon after that, a curfew was imposed. As per as A.H Laskar a police of Hailakandi police station, both parties were throwing stones at each other.

Economy

Tea is the important economic activity and Barak Valley have also its proportional share of tea garden in comparison to Brahmaputra valley to sustains its economy from time to time. There are plenty of oil and natural gas under the surface of Barak valley as well to run the economy as a separate state. Various oil refineries are also set up in various locations of Barak valley to meet the required economic demand. Jute is an important crop grown in this region. The Per Capita Income of Cachar is Rs. 19,551, for Hailakandi It stands at Rs. 19,055 and for Karimganj It is Rs. 20,093 respectively. Barak Region as a whole have a Per Capita Income of Rs. 58,699 which is way eventually less than the rest of the parts of Assam.

Poverty 
Barak valley region is the poorest part of Assam in terms of Gross Domestic Product and Human Development Index rank. More than half of the region's population lives in absolute poverty. According to a survey, 51% of the population of Hailakandi district, 42.4% of the population of Cachar district and 46% of the population of Karimganj district are multi-dimensionally poor and don't have proper access to safe drinking water, food, electricity, housing and shelter etc.

Forest cover

There are around 104 forest Villages in Barak Valley. Among the three districts in Barak Valley, Cachar have an area of 3,786 km22, out of which 2,222.34 km22 area is covered with forest, Hailakandi district have a total area of 1,327 km22, out of which 774.34 km22 is covered with forest, Karimganj district have a total area of 1,809 km22, out of which 851.43 km22 area is covered with forest.

List of districts in Barak valley

There are three districts in the Barak Valley.
Karimganj having an area of 1,809 km2 and is the second largest district of the valley.
Hailakandi having an area of 1,327 km2 is  third largest district of the valley.
Cachar having an area of 3,786 km2. It is the largest district of the valley.
The total area of the valley is 6,922 km2.

Historically, North Cachar Hills was once a part of Undivided Barak Valley. If that district is included, then the total area of Barak region as a whole increases up to 11,812 km2, which is way bigger than the neighbouring Tripura state which have a total area of 10,491 km2.

Wildlife

The Asian elephant has already vanished from most of the valley. Barail is the only wildlife sanctuary of the Barak valley region. It was initiated by noted naturalist Dr Anwaruddin Choudhury, who originally hailed from this region in the early 1980s. This sanctuary was ultimately notified in 2004. There are thirteen reserve forests in the valley comprising six in Karimganj, five in Cachar, and two are in Hailakandi. The Patharia hills reserve forest of Karimganj is the habitat of many mammals and was recommended to upgrade as 'Patharia hills wildlife sanctuary'. The southern part was also recommended as 'Dhaleswari' wildlife sanctuary.

Weather
Barak Valley has a temperature that varies 35° to 40 °C and also has a humid environment with rainfall varying from 100 to 200 cm. It is one of the hottest and humid region of entire North East.

Politics 

Bengali-dominated Barak valley have 15 Assembly seats. As per as vote share, Maximum of the people in the valley have supported BJP in 2021 Assam Legislative Assembly election followed by INC and AIUDF. It has been found that 48.7% vote share have gone in the favour of BJP, 27% to Indian National Congress and 21.9% to AIUDF in the last election. As per as seat share concerned, BJP have won 53.3% seats, 26.7% AIUDF and 20% Indian National Congress respectively.

Constituencies
Barak Valley has two Lok Sabha seats.
Karimganj (Lok Sabha constituency)
Silchar (Lok Sabha constituency)

Barak Valley has fifteen Assam Legislative Assembly seats.
Badarpur
Algapur
Hailakandi
Katlicherra
Karimganj South
Karimganj North
Ratabari
Patharkandi
Katigorah
Dholai
Udharbond
Sonai
Silchar
Barkhola
Lakhipur

Districts tehsils

Notable people
 Abdul Matlib Mazumdar, freedom fighter, cabinet minister in last ministry during British period and then after independence, in the first and subsequent ministries. Assam's first Agriculture, Veterinary, & Local self-government minister
 Moinul Hoque Choudhury, ex-Minister of Industries during Indira Gandhi regime, established All India Radio, National Institute of Technology, Silchar, Hindustan Paper Mill at Panchgram and Sugar Mill at Anipur
 Karnendu Bhattacharjee, ex-MP of Rajya Sabha, Indian National Congress
 Debojit Saha, singer and television host
 Radheshyam Biswas, former member of Lok Sabha, AIUDF
 Santosh Mohan Dev, former member of Lok Sabha, Indian National Congress, former Minister of Heavy Industry and Public Enterprises in the Union Cabinet
 Aminul Haque Laskar, Deputy Speaker of the Assam Legislative Assembly, Bharatiya Janata Party
 B. B. Bhattacharya, former Vice-Chancellor, Jawaharlal Nehru University, New Delhi
 Anwaruddin Choudhury, first Divisional Commissioner of Barak Valley when it was created as a separate division in 2015–16. Popularly known as the "Birdman of Assam" he authored 28 books on birds and mammals. He is also the first from Barak Valley to obtain a D.Sc. degree.
 Sushmita Dev Leader, All India Trinamool Congress
 Kalika Prasad Bhattacharya, singer
 Rajdeep Roy, Member of Lok Sabha, Silchar
 Kripanath Mallah, Member of Lok Sabha, Karimganj
 Gautam Roy, Ex Minister, Assam
 Pritam Das, Cricketer

See also
 Sylhet division
 Kachari Kingdom 
 Brahmaputra valley
 Hills and Barak Valley division

Notes

References

Sources

 
 
 
 
 

Bengali-speaking countries and territories
Regions of Assam
Valleys of India
Landforms of Assam
Assam Bengal